Old Dutch Mill may refer to:
Old Dutch Mill, Barrington, a windmill in Illinois
Old Dutch Mill, Chicago, a windmill in Illinois
Old Dutch Mill, Elmhurst, a windmill in Illinois
Fabyan Windmill or Old Dutch Mill, Geneva, a windmill in Illinois
Old Dutch Mill, Schiller Park, a windmill in Illinois
Old Dutch Mill, Smith Center, a windmill in Arizona
Old Dutch Mill, Wamego, a windmill in Arizona